Yong Pung How  (11 April 1926 – 9 January 2020) was a Malayan-born Singaporean judge who served as the second chief justice of Singapore between 1990 and 2006. He was appointed by President Wee Kim Wee, and took office on 28 September 1990. 

After stepping down as chief justice, Yong served as the chancellor of the Singapore Management University between 2010 and 2015. The Yong Pung How School of Law at the Singapore Management University was named after him in 2021.

Early life and education
Yong was born in Kuala Lumpur, Malaya, in an ethnic Chinese family with Hakka ancestry from Dabu County, Guangdong, China. His father, Yong Shook Lin, was a lawyer who founded the law firm Shook Lin & Bok. After completing his early education at Victoria Institution, Yong went on to read law at Downing College, Cambridge University. While in Cambridge, he developed close friendships with Lee Kuan Yew and Kwa Geok Choo. Yong was made an Exhibitioner and an Associate Fellow in his college years. In 1949, he graduated with a bachelor's degree in law, and qualified as an Inner Temple lawyer in 1952. 

In 1970, Yong attended the six-week Advanced Management Program at Harvard Business School.

Early career 
Yong was called to the English Bar at the Inner Temple and he returned to Malaya as an advocate and solicitor in 1952, practising law as a partner at his father's law firm, Shook Lin & Bok. 

In 1954, Yong also served as the arbitrator appointed by Sir John Fearns Nicoll, the Governor of Singapore, to resolve the dispute between the Singapore government and the general clerical services and telecommunications workers. He was also admitted into the Singapore Bar in 1964 and appointed to the role as Chairman of the Public Services Arbitration Tribunal in Malaya from 1954 to 1962, and as a Chairman of the Industrial Court in Malaysia between 1964 and 1967. 

Yong also had commercial powers invested upon him as Chairman of Malaysia-Singapore Airlines between 1964 and 1969, and as Deputy Chairman of Maybank between 1966 and 1972.

Career as a banker
In 1971, Yong switched from law to finance, and formed Singapore International Merchant Bankers Limited (SIMBL) and the Malaysian International Merchant Bankers (MIMB) in Malaysia, serving as Chairman and Managing Director of both companies. At the same time, he also served as a member of the Singapore Securities Industry Council from 1972 to 1981. He announced his retirement from the SIMBL and MIMB offices in 1976. In the same year, Yong was appointed Vice-Chairman of the Oversea-Chinese Banking Corporation (OCBC).

Yong was seconded in 1982 by the Singapore government to form and head the Government of Singapore Investment Corporation (GIC), and the Monetary Authority of Singapore (MAS) as well. His experience in commercial banking proved to be invaluable to GIC as he effectively re-organised and streamlined the use of Singapore's foreign reserves. He was also made Deputy Chairman of the Currency Commissioners, and Alternate Governor for Singapore of the International Monetary Fund. In 1988, Yong became the first Chairman of the newly formed Institute of Policy Studies, and established the Regional Speakers Programme, which saw prominent speakers and intellectuals from around the region to share their understanding of the culture and politics of the countries in the region. This initiative greatly helped with the development of Singapore governance.

In 1983, Yong returned to OCBC as chairman and chief executive officer, before returning to the legal sector as a judge in 1989.

Chief Justice

On 28 September 1990, Yong was appointed Chief Justice, replacing Wee Chong Jin. During his first speech at the opening of the legal year, he announced the abolition of the traditional wigs worn by judges and lawyers, and the use of archaic terms of address for judges of the Supreme Court such as "My Lord" or "Your Lordship". He also made the Singapore justice system more efficient in processing cases during his tenure by introducing cutting-edge technology into the courtroom.

In 1991, there were about 2,000 lawsuits due to be heard in the High Court. A lawsuit could take several years to be heard. Some measures were introduced to resolve the problems which he described as an "embarrassing" state of affairs. When Yong left, it took only six months for the High Court to conclude a hearing.

The speed at which trials were conducted led some critics to accuse Yong of convicting indiscriminately, leaving the burden of proof to the accused. As Chief Justice, he was also known to impose punitive sentences on those appealing cases he deemed to be frivolous.

Yong instituted night courts in the Subordinate Courts, eliminating the need for members of the public to take time off work to attend court to answer to summonses for regulatory and minor offences. He also initiated the Justices' Law Clerk (JLC) scheme, under which top law graduates from leading universities in the United Kingdom and Singapore are actively recruited to the Singapore Legal Service. First deployed in 1997 and completed in 2003, the Electronic Filing System (EFS), designed to streamline the litigation process using technology, was introduced during Yong's tenure as Chief Justice. The EFS was later replaced by the Integrated Electronic Litigation System, and was decommissioned on 1 February 2014.

In April 2006, Yong was succeeded as Chief Justice by Chan Sek Keong, who was formerly Attorney-General of Singapore.

Awards and honours
Yong was conferred the Darjah Utama Bakti Cemerlang (Distinguished Service Order) in 1989 and the Order of Temasek (First Class) on 9 August 1999, with a citation stating that "as Chief Justice since 28 September 1990, Justice Yong Pung How has made the Singapore Judiciary world class".

On 17 September 2001, Yong was awarded an honorary Doctor of Laws by the National University of Singapore Faculty of Law in recognition of his outstanding contribution to the judiciary and the judicial system in Singapore. Yong was credited with introducing sweeping reforms in the legal service, enhancing the quality and efficiency of Singapore's judicial process and making the Singapore judiciary world-class. Among his innovations was the introduction of case management which helped clear the backlog of cases and reduced the waiting time for the disposal of cases.

On 14 July 2007, Yong was awarded another honorary Doctor of Laws by the Singapore Management University (SMU) in recognition of his contribution to Singapore's legal sector. Yong was appointed as the chairman of the SMU School of Law's advisory board in March 2007. In 2007, SMU also established the Yong Pung How Professorship of Law, named after Yong and made possible by a S$3 million endowed contribution from the Yong Shook Lin Trust, which was named after Yong's father.

On 1 September 2010, Yong was appointed chancellor of the Singapore Management University. J. Y. Pillay succeed him on 1 September 2015.

On 11 April 2021, SMU's School of Law was renamed as the Yong Pung How School of Law.

Personal life
Yong and Cheang Wei-Woo, a graduate of the London School of Economics, married in 1955 after having met in 1950 while they were studying. They have a daughter, Yong Ying-I, who is a Permanent Secretary at the Ministry of Communications and Information. Yong died on 9 January 2020, at age 93.

Yong was the cousin of Yong Siew Toh—who the conservatory of the National University of Singapore is named in honour of—who was in turn the daughter of Yong Loo Lin, a businessman and medical doctor who the medical school of NUS is named after.

References

Further reading
.
. 2 vols.

1926 births
2020 deaths
Alumni of Downing College, Cambridge
Chief justices of Singapore
Judges of the Supreme Court of Singapore
Malaysian emigrants to Singapore
Malaysian people of Hakka descent
Members of the Inner Temple
Naturalised citizens of Singapore
People from Dabu
People from Kuala Lumpur
People who lost Malaysian citizenship
Recipients of the Darjah Utama Temasek
Singaporean bankers
20th-century Singaporean judges
21st-century Singaporean judges
Singaporean people of Hakka descent